Murray Township may refer to:

In Canada
 Murray Township, Ontario

In the United States

 Murray Township, Newton County, Arkansas, in Newton County, Arkansas
 Murray Township, Alameda County, California
 Murray Township, Marshall County, Kansas, in Marshall County, Kansas
 Murray Township, Murray County, Minnesota
 Murray Township, Greene County, Missouri

Township name disambiguation pages